Philipp Albert (born 15 April 1990) is a German footballer who plays as a midfielder for SV Riedmoos.

Career
Albert made his professional debut for Wehen Wiesbaden in the 3. Liga on 28 November 2009, coming on as a substitute in the 83rd minute for Sebastian Reinert in the 1–5 away loss against FC Ingolstadt.

References

External links
 Profile at DFB.de
 Profile at kicker.de
 SFC Stern 1900 statistics at Fussball.de
 SV Riedmoos statistics 2018–19 season at BFV.de

1990 births
Living people
Sportspeople from Mainz
Footballers from Rhineland-Palatinate
German footballers
Association football midfielders
SV Wehen Wiesbaden players
3. Liga players
Regionalliga players
21st-century German people